The 1917 Toledo Blue and Gold football team was an American football team that represented Toledo University (renamed the University of Toledo in 1967) as an independent during the 1917 college football season. In their first season fielding a varsity football team, the Blue and Gold were coached by engineering professor John Brandeberry, compiled a 0–3 record, failed to score a point, and were outscored by all opponents by a combined total of 262 to 0. The school losses to the University of Detroit and Ohio Northern by scores of 145 to 0 and 90 to 0, respectively, remain the worst defeats in program history. The team's 13 members were required to purchase their own uniforms and had no practice scrimmages before the first game against Detroit. Ken Keller was the team captain.

Schedule

References

Toledo
Toledo Rockets football seasons
College football winless seasons
Toledo Blue and Gold football